Timiryazeva is a rural locality (a settlement) and the administrative center of Timiryazevskoye Rural Settlement of Maykopsky District, Russia. The population was 1163 as of 2018. There are 6 streets.

Geography 
Timiryazeva is located 8 km south of Tulsky (the district's administrative centre) by road. Michurina is the nearest rural locality.

References 

Rural localities in Maykopsky District